Campo Alegre de Goiás is a municipality in southeastern Goiás state, Brazil. It is the largest producer of coffee in the state and an important producer of soybeans, corn, and wheat.

Geography
Campo Alegre is located in the statistical micro-region of Catalão.  It is 326 km. from the state capital, Goiânia and is connected by BR-352 / Bela Vista de Goiás / Cristianópolis / GO-020 / Pires do Rio / GO-330 / Ipameri / Catalão / BR-050.

It has boundaries with Catalão (south), Ipameri (north and east), and Paracatu (east). Three rivers cross the municipality:  Rio Veríssimo, Rio São Marcos and Rio Pirapitinga.

History
Campo Alegre de Goiás began as a stopping point in 1833 for the muleteers crossing the different routes in the province of Goiás.  The first name was Calaça.  It became a district of Ipameri in 1907.  In 1944 the name was changed to Rudá, which means God of love in the local indigenous language.  Later the name was changed back to Campo Alegre de Goiás when the town was detached from Ipameri and made a municipality.

Demographic and political data
Population density in 2007: 2,34 inhabitants/km2
Population growth rate 2000/2007: 3.52.%
Urban population in 2007: 4,160
Rural population in 2007: 1,607
Eligible voters in 2007: 3,966
City government  in 2005: mayor (José Lourenço Peixoto), vice-mayor (Luiz Manteiga Alvares de Campos), and 09 councilmembers

Economy
The economy is based on agriculture, with important plantations of coffee, soybeans, wheat, corn, and cattle raising. There are also extensive plantations of eucalyptus, which is used to make charcoal and transported to the metallurgy industries of the Belo Horizonte industrial belt.

Economic data
Industrial establishments in 2007: 15
Retail establishments in 2007: 93
Financial institutions in 2007: Banco Itaú, Banco do Brasil
Cattle: 68,500
Main crops:  In 2006 the main crops were cotton (2,800 hectares), garlic, rice, potatoes, coffee, beans (2,500 hectares), and soybeans (57,000 hectares). There were 339 farms with a total area of 232,672 ha., of which 105,419 ha. were pasture, 3,870 ha. were permanent crops, 70,157 were perennial crops, and 49,330 ha. were woodland. There were 1,250 persons dependent on agriculture. There were 331 tractors and 105 farms had tractors.

Health and education
Infant mortality rate in 2000: 14.32
Public health clinics in 2007: 03
Hospitals in 2007: 01 with 6 beds
Literacy rate in 2000: 89.4
Schools in 2006: 10 with 1,662 students
Higher education: none in 2005

Campo Alegre has a relatively high standard of living. On the United Nations Human Development Index Campo Alegre had a rating of 0.802,which ranked it 9 out of a total of 242 municipalities in the state of Goiás. Nationally it was ranked  532 out of 5,507 municipalities. (All data are from 2000.) For the complete list see Frigoletto

See also
List of municipalities in Goiás
Microregions of Goiás

References

Frigoletto

Municipalities in Goiás